Gabriela Nicole Garton (born 27 May 1990), known as Gaby Garton, is an American-born Argentine footballer who last played as a goalkeeper for Melbourne Victory and the Argentina women's national team.

Her father is American and her mother is Argentine. She was raised in Sarasota, Florida.

College career
Garton attended the University of South Florida and the Rice University.

Club career

Essendon Royals
In November 2019, Garton joined Australian club Essendon Royals.

Melbourne Victory
In December 2020, Garton joined Australian W-League club Melbourne Victory.

Following the season, Garton stepped away from the playing squad as an expectant mother, and was appointed as a development coach by the club.

International career
Garton was selected by Argentina for the 2019 FIFA Women's World Cup.

References

External links

https://www.dailyherald.com/article/20190527/sports/305279941

1990 births
Living people
Women's association football goalkeepers
Argentine women's footballers
Argentina women's international footballers
2019 FIFA Women's World Cup players
Club Atlético River Plate (women) players
UAI Urquiza (women) players
Melbourne Victory FC (A-League Women) players
Argentine people of American descent
American women's soccer players
Soccer players from Minnesota
Sportspeople from Rochester, Minnesota
Soccer players from Florida
Sportspeople from Sarasota, Florida
South Florida Bulls women's soccer players
Rice Owls women's soccer players
American people of Argentine descent
American emigrants to Argentina